Sunnynook is a hamlet in southern Alberta, Canada within Special Area No. 2. The hamlet formerly housed the Berry Creek Community School Division office and area post office until amalgamation of the school division into Prairie Land Regional Division.

Demographics 
Sunnynook recorded a population of 13 in the 1991 Census of Population conducted by Statistics Canada.

See also 
List of communities in Alberta
List of hamlets in Alberta

References 

Hamlets in Alberta
Special Area No. 2